Chang Cheng-wei (born 5 August 1986) is a Taiwanese baseball player for the Fubon Guardians of the Chinese Professional Baseball League (CPBL).

Career
He made his debut in the Chinese Professional Baseball League at age 23. Chang is the nephew of Chang Tai-shan and a cousin of Chang Chih-hao.

Chang was drafted by the Sinon Bulls in 2008. He led the Taiwanese minors in hits (81) and average (a record .409) in 2009. When Sinon let him go, he signed with the Brother Elephants. On March 20, he got his first CPBL hit, a single off Wei-Lun Pan. He hit .297/.360/.377 as a rookie with 15 steals (but 10 times caught). He was 8th in the 2010 CPBL in average.

Chang joined the Fubon Guardians for the 2018 season after spending 2010 to 2017 with the Brothers.

International career
He played for Chinese Taipei in the 2013 World Baseball Classic Qualification, 2013 World Baseball Classic and 2017 World Baseball Classic.

External links
Baseball America

1986 births
Living people
Baseball outfielders
Brother Elephants players
Fubon Guardians players
People from Taitung County
Taiwanese baseball players
2013 World Baseball Classic players
2017 World Baseball Classic players